Emmanuel (Eman) Appiah (born September 26, 1993) is a Ghanaian professional footballer.

Career
Appiah began his soccer career in the United States playing club soccer for Blast FC in Columbus, Ohio. He is a 2011 graduate of Westerville Central High School. Following, Appiah spent five years playing college soccer at the University of Cincinnati between 2011 and 2015.

While at Cincinnati, Appiah appeared for Premier Development League side GPS Portland Phoenix in 2013.

Appiah was drafted 15th overall in the 2016 MLS SuperDraft by Colorado Rapids.

He was loaned to Charlotte Independence on March 15, 2016.

He was released by Colorado on June 30, 2016. He signed with MLS side Sporting Kansas City on July 12, 2016.

On July 26, 2017, Appiah signed with United Soccer League side Saint Louis FC until the end of the 2017 season.

On March 14, 2018, Appiah joined USL Championship side LA Galaxy II.

Following over a year without a professional club, Appiah joined Finnish side AC Kajaani in June 2020.

References

External links 
 

1993 births
Living people
AC Kajaani players
Association football midfielders
Charlotte Independence players
Cincinnati Bearcats men's soccer players
Colorado Rapids draft picks
Colorado Rapids players
Expatriate footballers in Finland
Expatriate soccer players in the United States
Ghanaian footballers
Ghanaian expatriate footballers
GPS Portland Phoenix players
LA Galaxy II players
Major League Soccer players
People from Westerville, Ohio
Saint Louis FC players
Soccer players from Columbus, Ohio
Sporting Kansas City players
Sporting Kansas City II players
USL Championship players
USL League Two players